Raven in My Eyes is the fourth album released by rapper Andre Nickatina. It was released on June 23, 1998 for Dogday Records and was produced by Andre Nickatina, Nick Peace, DJ Pause and the Fillmoe Coleman Band (Black Diamond and Tebo). This was an extension of Cocaine Raps Vol. 1, which was released as a limited edition of 2,000 copies months before the release of Raven In My Eyes. The Tracks "Nickatina Creation" and "Diamonds & Carats" are both Remixes.

Track listing
"Nickatina Creation" – 3:23 
"Crack Raider Razor" – 3:29 
"3:00 A.M." – 3:58 
"Sly Stone [Interlude]" – 0:42 
"The Carnival" (Ft. Lolo Swift) – 4:26 
"I'm a Pisces" – 3:22 
"Diamonds & Carats" – 3:03 
"Gingerbread Crumbz" – 4:11 
"Scent of a Woman [Filmoe Coleman Band Instrumental]" – 3:09
"88" – 3:33 
"Raven" – 3:41 
"Andre Nickatina" – 2:39 
"Yssup" (Ft. Lolo Swift) – 3:38 
"Thank of Me" – 2:47 
"Cadillac [Filmoe Coleman Band Instrumental]" – 4:06
"Cobra Status" – 3:42 
"Mother" – 3:36 
"45 Caliber Raps" – 3:11

References

1997 albums
Andre Nickatina albums